The Chilean Athletics Federation (Federación Atlética de Chile) (FEDACHI) is the governing body of athletics in Chile. It served the purpose of the Chilean Olympic Committee until one was established in 1934. The president for the period 2014-2017 was Juan Luis Carter.

History 
FEDACHI was founded on 21 May 1914. First president was Erasmo Arellano Durán. FEDACHI was one of three founder members of the CONSUDATLE on 24 May 1918, in Buenos Aires. Former president until 2013 was Álvaro González.

Affiliations 
FEDACHI is the national member federation for Chile in the following international organisations:
World Athletics
Confederación Sudamericana de Atletismo (CONSUDATLE; South American Athletics Confederation)
Association of Panamerican Athletics (APA)
Asociación Iberoamericana de Atletismo (AIA; Ibero-American Athletics Association)

Moreover, it is part of the following national organisations:
Chilean Olympic Committee (Spanish: Comité Olímpico de Chile)

Members 
FEDACHI comprises the regional athletics associations of Chile.

National records 
FEDACHI maintains the Chilean records in athletics.

References

External links 
  (in Spanish)

Chile
Sports governing bodies in Chile
Sport in Chile
National governing bodies for athletics
1914 establishments in Chile
Sports organizations established in 1914